This is a list of artists who have recorded for American record label Hollywood Records. Listed in parentheses are names of Hollywood Records-affiliated labels to which the artist may be signed.

0–9
3rd Strike (disbanded, lead singer Jim Korthe deceased)
3½ Minutes (disbanded)

A–M

Alejandro Aranda (Scarypoolparty)
Almost Monday
Alpha Rev (active)
Aly & AJ (active; briefly went under the name 78violet; the sisters are also pursuing acting careers.)
Allstar Weekend (disbanded)
AREA21
Bobby Andonov (BOBI)
Apartment 26 (disbanded)
Anna Margaret (active; transferred to sister label Walt Disney Records)
Atreyu (active; with Spinefarm)
Ballas Hough Band (active; with Morey Management)
BBMak (disbanded, reformed in 2018)
2018)
Bella Thorne (pursuing acting career)
Big Kenny (active; signed to Love Everybody Records)
Breaking Benjamin
Brian May (active; with Queen)
Bridgit Mendler (active; with Black Box Music; also pursuing acting career)
Butthole Surfers (active)
Austin Butler (pursuing acting; was only signed to release music for Ruby & The Rockits)
Sofia Carson
Caroline's Spine (active, with 7th Kid Entertainment)
CB30
Charizma & Peanut Butter Wolf (Hollywood BASIC)
Cherri Bomb (active, signed with Hi or Hey Records as Hey Violet)
 Chris Perez Band (Resurrection, moved to Univision Music Group, led by Chris Perez) 
The Cheetah Girls (disbanded; members now performing solo or pursuing other interests)
China Anne McClain (active; unsigned, pursuing acting career)
Connecticut Red (inactive; unsigned, pursuing directing career as Jesse Cilio)
The Crosswalk (disbanded)
Corbin Bleu (pursuing a career in acting)
Miley Cyrus (active; with Columbia; also pursuing acting)
Danzig (active; with Evilive Records)
Morris Day (active; unsigned)
The Dead Milkmen (reunited; unsigned, but self-releasing material)
Diffuser (active; with Chamberlain Records)
Marié Digby (active; unsigned)
DREAMERS
Haylie Duff (active; pursuing her acting and writing career; never released her debut album due to conflict with label)
Hilary Duff (active; with RCA; also pursuing acting and writing careers)
Duran Duran (active; with Warner Bros. Records)
Elefant (active; unsigned)
Evans Blue  (on hiatus; signed with Sounds + Sights Records)
Everlife (active; with 97 Records)
Fashion Bomb (active; with Full Effect Records)
Fastball (active; with Megaforce Records)
Fishbone (active; with Ter A Terre Records)
Flipp (active)
The Fluid (disbanded)
Forever in Your Mind
Forty Foot Echo (active)
Flashlight Brown (inactive)
Selena Gomez (active; with Interscope; also pursuing acting)
Grace Potter and the Nocturnals
Gran Bel Fisher (inactive)
Hi-C (Hollywood BASIC) (inactive)
Honor Society (disbanded)
Laine Hardy
Olivia Holt
Vanessa Hudgens (pursuing acting career)
Human Waste Project (disbanded)
Indigo Girls (active; with IG Recordings/Vanguard Records)
Ingram Hill (active; unsigned)
 In Real Life (disbanded)
Insane Clown Posse (active; with Psychopathic Records)
Into Another (active; with Revelation Records)
Samantha Janus (pursuing acting career)
Seu Jorge (active; with Cafuné Gravadora)
Jesse McCartney (active; with Blue Suit; also pursuing acting career)
Jonas Brothers (reunited; with Republic; members are also pursuing solo careers or and other interests)
Joe Jonas (active; with DNCE, DNCE are signed to Republic)
Jorge Blanco
Coco Jones  (active; with Def Jam; also pursuing acting)
Jessica Sutta (active; with Premier League Music)
Josh Kelley (active; with MCA Nashville)
Joywave
Leftover Salmon (reunited; unsigned)
Lifers Group (Hollywood BASIC)
Los Lobos (active)
Demi Lovato (active; with Island; also pursuing acting)
Loudmouth (active)
Max and Harvey
McClain Sisters (active under the name Thriii; unsigned)
JD McCrary
Idina Menzel (active; with Warner Bros. Records; also pursuing broadway and acting career)
Freddie Mercury (deceased)
Bea Miller
The Minus 5 (active; with Yep Roc Records)
Mitsou
Myra (active; unsigned)

N–Z

New Hope Club
Nick Jonas & the Administration (Nick Jonas went solo, also pursuing an acting and modelling career)
Nobody's Angel (disbanded; members have performed solo and pursued acting careers)
Organized Konfusion (Hollywood BASIC)
Ricky Guillart
Hayden Panettiere (pursuing acting; started recording album but never released it)
The Party (disbanded 1993; reassembled in 2016 independently as well releasing solo records)
Regis Philbin (deceased)
Plain White T's (active, with Fearless Records)
Cole Plante
The Polyphonic Spree (active; with Kirtland)
Jordan Pruitt (active; unsigned)
Queen 
Queen + Paul Rodgers (US & Canada; disbanded)
R5 (disbanded)
Raw Fusion (Hollywood BASIC)
Redlight King (active; now making and distributing own music)
Rattlebone (disbanded)
Raven-Symoné (pursuing acting career and talk show gigs)
Calvin Richardson (active; signed to Shanachie Records)
Jessica Riddle (changed name to Jessica Jacobs; unsigned)
Nydia Rojas (on hiatus)
Sabrina Carpenter (active; with Island; also pursuing acting)
Sacred Reich (active; with Metal Blade)
The Scream (disbanded; members have joined Mötley Crüe and form DC-10)
Seaweed (active; unsigned)
The Brian Setzer Orchestra (active; signed to Surfdog Records)
Simon Says (changed name to Key to Arson; then disbanded)
Mauro Scocco (US; active) (1996-1999)
Sy Smith (active; with Lola Waxx Records)
Sparta (on hiatus)
Sprung Monkey (active; with Black Cat Do Records)
Stryper (active; with Frontiers Records)
Stefano Langone (active, unsigned)
Tina Sugandh (active; with Razor & Tie)
The Suicide Machines (signed to SideOneDummy, disbanded 2006, reunited 2019)
Shady Montage (active; now known as Shade Sheist)
TINI
T-Ride (disbanded)
Tricky (non-Europe; active)
Tsar (active; unsigned) 
Alexa Vega (pursuing acting career; was only signed to release music for Ruby & The Rockits)
Kyle Vincent (active)
World War III (active; with SME Records)
Yothu Yindi (USA; disbanded)
Youngstown (disbanded)
Z-Trip (active; with Hard Left Records)
Zendaya (active, signed to Republic Records; pursuing acting career)
ZZ Ward

References

See also

 List of current Hollywood Records artists
 Lists of musicians
 Music of the United States

 
Lists of former recording artists by label
Disney-related lists